The Shard, also referred to as the Shard London Bridge and formerly London Bridge Tower, is a 72-storey skyscraper, designed by the Italian architect Renzo Piano, in Southwark, London, that forms part of The Shard Quarter development. It is also the second-tallest free-standing structure in the United Kingdom, after the concrete tower of the Emley Moor transmitting station. It replaced Southwark Towers, a 24-storey office block built on the site in 1975.

The Shard's construction began in March 2009; it was topped out on 30 March 2012 and inaugurated on 5 July 2012. Practical completion was achieved in November 2012. The tower's privately operated observation deck, The View from The Shard, was opened to the public on 1 February 2013. The Shard was developed by Sellar Property Group on behalf of LBQ Ltd and is jointly owned by Sellar Property (5%) and the State of Qatar (95%).

Background

Planning
In 1998, London-based entrepreneur Irvine Sellar and his partners decided to redevelop the 1970s-era Southwark Towers following a UK government white paper encouraging the development of tall buildings at major transport hubs. Sellar flew to Berlin in the spring of 2000 to meet the Italian architect Renzo Piano for lunch. According to Sellar, Piano spoke of his contempt for conventional tall buildings during the meal, before flipping over the restaurant's menu and sketching a spire-like sculpture emerging from the River Thames.

In July 2002, the Deputy Prime Minister, John Prescott, ordered a planning inquiry after the development plans for the Shard were opposed by the Commission for Architecture and the Built Environment and several heritage bodies, including the Royal Parks Foundation and English Heritage. The inquiry took place in April and May 2003, and on 19 November 2003, the Office of the Deputy Prime Minister announced that planning consent had been approved. The government stated that:

Sellar and his original partners CLS Holdings plc and CN Ltd (acting for the Halabi Family Trust) secured an interim funding package of £196 million in September 2006 from the Nationwide Building Society and Kaupthing Singer & Friedlander. This enabled them to pay off the costs already incurred and to buy out the Southwark Towers occupational lease from the building's tenants, PricewaterhouseCoopers. Vacant possession of the site was secured a year later, after PricewaterhouseCoopers completed the relocation of their operations.

In September 2007, preparations for the demolition of Southwark Towers began. However, later that same month, turbulence in the financial markets reportedly put the Shard's construction in jeopardy, threatening to render the project an example of the Skyscraper Index.

In November 2007, building contractor Mace was awarded the contract to build the Shard for a fixed price of no more than £350 million. However, this price increased to almost £435 million in October 2008.

In April 2008, demolition of Southwark Towers was visibly under way, and by October, the building had been substantially reduced in height, and was no longer visible on the skyline. The demolition was completed in early 2009, and site preparation began for the construction of the Shard.

Funding
Towards the end of 2007, the gathering uncertainty in the global financial markets sparked concerns about the viability of the Shard. However, in January 2008, Sellar announced that it had secured funding from a consortium of Qatari investors, who had paid £150 million to secure an 80% stake in the project. The consortium included Qatar National Bank, QInvest, Qatari Islamic Bank and the Qatari property developer Barwa Real Estate, as well as Sellar Property. The deal involved a buyout of the Halabi and CLS Holdings stakes, and part of the Sellar Property stake. The new owners promised to provide the first tranche of finance, allowing construction of the tower to begin. In 2009, the State of Qatar consolidated its ownership of London Bridge Quarter (known now as Shard Quarter), including The Shard, through the purchase of the private Qatari investors' stakes. Shard Quarter is today jointly owned by the State of Qatar and Sellar.

Architecture

Renzo Piano, the project's architect, designed The Shard as a spire-like sculpture emerging from the River Thames. He was inspired by the railway lines next to the site, the London spires depicted by the 18th-century Venetian painter Canaletto, and the masts of sailing ships. Piano's design met criticism from English Heritage, who claimed the building would be "a shard of glass through the heart of historic London", giving the building its name, The Shard. Piano considered the slender, spire-like form of the tower a positive addition to the London skyline, recalling the church steeples featured in historic engravings of the city, and believed that its presence would be far more delicate than opponents of the project alleged. He proposed a sophisticated use of glazing, with expressive façades of angled glass panes intended to reflect sunlight and the sky above, so that the appearance of the building will change according to the weather and seasons. The building features 11,000 panes of glass, with a total surface area of  equivalent to the area of almost eight Wembley football pitches.

The Shard was designed with energy efficiency in mind. It is fitted with a combined heat and power (CHP) plant, operating on natural gas from the National Grid. Fuel is efficiently converted to electricity, and heat is recovered from the engine to provide hot water for the building.

Following the destruction of New York's World Trade Center (WTC) in the terror attacks of 11 September 2001, architects and structural engineers worldwide began re-evaluating the design of tall structures. The Shard's early conceptual designs were among the first in the UK to be amended following the publication of the US National Institute of Standards and Technology (NIST) report into the collapse of the WTC.

In 2014, The Shard claimed first place at the Emporis Skyscraper Awards, recognising buildings over  completed in the previous twelve months. The Emporis judges hailed the building as "a skyscraper that is recognized immediately and which is already considered London's new emblem".

Layout

Sources:  The-Shard.com and The-Shard.com and Billionpoints.de.

Construction

For the construction of the skyscraper some path-breaking engineering methods were used, such as top-down construction, where foundations are dug while the core is built up – this was a first for the UK. In February 2009, a mobile crane and a small piling rig arrived on site. In early March 2009, the crane began putting steel beams into the ground, as part of preparations for the core of the building. Full construction began on 16 March 2009. Demolition work on New London Bridge House started in May 2009, as part of the concurrent London Bridge Place project. The first steelwork went into The Shard's piles on 28 April. Five cranes were used to build The Shard, with four of them 'jumping' with the tower as it rose. Crane 1 was erected in September 2009 and Crane 2 was erected at the beginning of October. By 20 October 2009, steel beams began appearing on site, with concrete being poured at the northern part of the site, ready for Crane 3.

By March 2010, the concrete core was rising steadily at about  a day. On 27 July 2010, the core stopped rising, having reached the 38th floor, and was reconfigured for further construction. By mid-November 2010, the core had reached the 68th floor, with the tower's steel reaching the 40th floor and glass cladding enveloping a third of the building. In late November, the core's height exceeded , ending One Canada Square's 18-year reign as Britain's tallest building.

The early part of January 2011 saw the installation of hydraulic screens, which were used to form the concrete floors of the hotel and apartment section of the tower, and rose with the floors up to the 69th floor. On 25 January 2011, the concrete pumps began pouring the first concrete floor at the 41st floor. By the end of February 2011, concrete flooring had risen to the 46th floor, with a new floor being poured on average every week. The cladding of the structure also progressed, mainly on the tower's "backpack". During this phase of construction, a fox was discovered living at the top of the unfinished skyscraper. The fox, named Romeo by staff, is thought to have entered the building through the central stairwell. It survived by eating scraps of food left by builders working on the incomplete structure. The fox was captured and taken to Riverside Animal Centre in Wallington.

August 2011 saw steady progress in construction, with cladding enveloping more than half the building's exterior. Pouring of the concrete floors reached the 67th floor, and progression on the tower's cladding reached the 58th floor. By mid-August, the core box had been removed. By 19 September 2011, the tower's steel was approaching the height of the completed core, reaching almost . On 24 September, a final crane – at the time, the tallest ever built in Britain – was erected to install the skyscraper's upper spire. The spire was pre-fabricated and pre-assembled based upon 3D models, and underwent a "test run" in Yorkshire before being lifted onto the building itself. By late December 2011, the Shard had become the tallest building in the European Union, superseding the Commerzbank Tower in Frankfurt, Germany.

The Shard's steel structure was topped out on 30 March 2012, when its , 500-tonne spire was winched into place.

The Shard was inaugurated on 5 July 2012 by the Prime Minister of Qatar, Hamad bin Jassim bin Jaber Al Thani, in a ceremony attended by Prince Andrew, Duke of York. Practical completion of the building was achieved in November 2012.

Gallery

Height

It is taller than Frankfurt's Commerzbank Tower at  the record holder between 1997 and 2005 and three later skyscrapers of Moscow: the Triumph-Palace, Naberezhnaya Tower, and City of Capitals. These three had each held the title for roughly  years. The Shard was overtaken by a fourth such tower in November 2012: the  Mercury City Tower. The Shard was surpassed as the tallest European building outside Russia by the 310-metre (1,017 ft) Varso Tower, Warsaw, Poland in February 2021.

The Shard is the second-tallest free-standing structure in the United Kingdom, after the  concrete transmission tower at Emley Moor. Another planned London skyscraper, the Pinnacle (now replaced by 22 Bishopsgate), was originally proposed to rival the height of The Shard, but was reduced to a height of  because of concerns from the Civil Aviation Authority. It is taller than all of the natural peaks in London and in adjoining counties, the highest of which is Walbury Hill, close to Wiltshire.

Tenants
The Shard comprises a 26-floor office complex, occupied by 32 companies across 10 business sectors, 3 restaurants—Aqua Shard, Oblix, and Hutong—the five-star Shangri-La The Shard, London hotel, 10 residential apartments, and the UK's highest viewing gallery, The View from The Shard.

In February 2013, The Sunday Times reported that the developers of The Shard were in negotiations to secure the first tenants of the building's 26 floors of office space. At the time, potential tenants included financial restructuring specialists Duff & Phelps, private equity firm Hatton Corporation, and the South Hook Liquefied Natural Gas Company.

The Shard's fourth, fifth, and sixth floors host the HCA (Hospital Corporations of America), part of London Bridge Hospital. The Shard's 31st, 32nd, and 33rd floors host three restaurants: Oblix, Hutong, and Aqua Shard. The building's Shangri-La Hotel  occupies floors 34–52. The hotel was initially expected to open by the end of 2013, but its opening was ultimately delayed to 6 May 2014. In March 2014, Mathys & Squire became the first law firm to take tenancy in the building. In May 2014, the Foresight Group, an investment firm, moved its head UK office into The Shard on the 17th floor. In June 2015, Warwick Business School opened its new base in The Shard, occupying the same floor and was officially opened by the mayor of London, Boris Johnson. It houses a 100-seat lecture theatre and a smaller one at 60 seats, plus 8 seminar rooms and an IT lab, offering postgraduate and executive education.

In July 2013, the Qatari broadcaster Al Jazeera Media Network announced that it would open a new television studio and newsroom for Al Jazeera English in The Shard. Al Jazeera moved in on 13 September 2014; its first live broadcast from the building was on 10 November 2014. The facility currently houses all primary operations for Al Jazeera Media Network's channels in London; it is capable of running an entire channel independent from Al Jazeera's other hubs, and is the network's second-biggest hub after its facility in Doha, Qatar.

In January 2015, further tenants for The Shard were announced, including IO Oil & Gas Consulting, Gallup, and The Office Group. In May 2015, the American recruitment consultancy Robert Half International announced that it would move several branches of its business into The Shard, having purchased  of floor space on the tower's tenth floor. In August 2015, the international law firm Greenberg Traurig announced that it would open its offices on the eighth floor of The Shard by the end of the year.

Matches Fashion took over 35,000 sq ft in January 2016, and six months later expanded its headquarter's presence in The Shard by 40%. A month later, publishing house Dods Group let almost  on Level 11, becoming The Shard's 28th office occupier. In December, Kraft Heinz relocated their European and UK headquarters from Hayes in Hillingdon to The Shard after taking  on Levels 20 & 21.

The Shard offices were announced as fully let in October 2017, following lettings to Mitie and existing occupiers, Foresight Group, and Warwick Business School.

Urban exploration, BASE jumping, and climbing
In December 2011, a group of recreational explorers calling themselves the Place Hackers evaded security and made their way to the top of the Shard building site, climbing one of the tallest cranes in the process. They later posted photographs of the London skyline taken from the top of the Shard on the Internet and received wide media attention. One member of the group, Oxford University researcher Bradley Garrett, later revealed to various news outlets that over 20 urban explorers had made their way to the top of the building during its construction. In a 2012 article for Domus magazine, Garrett wrote that "the conceptual barrier to places in our cities is brought about by a process of engineered exclusion" and that the explorers were "cultivating the creative city that money can't buy".

BASE jumpers reportedly jumped from The Shard more than a dozen times between 2009 and 2012. Four jumps were reportedly made by Essex roofer Dan Witchalls, who had filmed one attempt with a helmet-mounted camera. In March 2016 another person BASE jumped from The Shard.

On 3 September 2012, a team of 40 people, including Prince Andrew, Duke of York, abseiled from the tower's 87th floor. This feat was performed to raise money for the Outward Bound Trust and the Royal Marines Charitable Trust Fund. In November 2012, the French urban climber Alain Robert was spotted in the building by security guards. At the end of the month, the Shard's owners won an injunction to prevent him from entering or climbing the building.

On 11 July 2013, six female Greenpeace volunteers climbed the Shard and unfurled a flag in protest against Arctic oil drilling by Royal Dutch Shell. The women announced they were "experienced climbers", but medical personnel were summoned to the base of the tower nonetheless. The Shard's staff closed the tower's observatory and gave the women a safety briefing and other advice during their climb. After completing their 16-hour climb, the six women were arrested by police on suspicion of aggravated trespass.

In popular culture

The Shard appears in the 2012 short film The Snowman and The Snowdog and its tie-in computer game.
 The Shard has a significant role in the 2013 Doctor Who episode "The Bells of Saint John" as the headquarters of the episode's antagonist, the Great Intelligence. The Doctor vertically rode an anti-gravity motorbike on the face of the building and through a window to reach the Great Intelligence's headquarters.
The Shard appears in the climactic scene of the 2019 film Spider-Man: Far From Home. It is Nick Fury/Talos's & Maria Hill/Soren's lookout while the final battle takes place between Spider-Man and Mysterio on Tower Bridge.
The Pokémon Duraludon and its Gigantamax form from Pokémon Sword and Shield are based on the Shard.
The Shard appears in the 2020 video game Watch Dogs: Legion, referred to chiefly as 'Nexus Tower'.
The Shard features prominently in the 2022 music video for the Machine Gun Kelly song "Maybe".

See also

 List of tallest buildings and structures in London
 List of tallest buildings in the world

Similar structures
 Al Faisaliyah Center
 Lotte World Tower
 Ryugyong Hotel
 Transamerica Pyramid
 Lakhta Center

Footnotes

References

External links

 
 The Shard, London
 The Shard on CTBUH Skyscraper Center.
 The Shard Special. Estates Gazette. 2012. Retrieved 4 February 2013.
 Live daylight webcam image via Google Sites.
 Internal and external photos of the Shard via Shardldn.com.

Office buildings completed in 2012
Residential buildings completed in 2012
Office buildings in London
Redevelopment projects in London
Renzo Piano buildings
Residential skyscrapers in London
Shangri-La Hotels and Resorts
Skyscrapers in the London Borough of Southwark
High-tech architecture
Modern architecture in the United Kingdom
Television studios in London
Mixed-use developments in the United Kingdom
Skyscraper hotels in London
Skyscraper office buildings in London